A fortune cookie is a food item.

Fortune Cookie, Fortune Cookies, or The Fortune Cookie may also refer to:

 The Fortune Cookie, a 1966 film
 Fortune Cookies (album), a 2001 album by Alana Davis
 "Koi Suru Fortune Cookie", a 2013 song by Japanese group AKB48
 "The Fortune Cookie", an episode of the television series Mona the Vampire
 Fortune Cookie (novel), a 2010 novel by Bryce Courtenay
 "Fortune Cookie" (Shonen Knife song)
 "Fortune Cookie" (Emma Bale song)